Thornton Fleming Brodhead (1822 – August 31, 1862) was a brevet brigadier general during the American Civil War.

Biography
Thornton Fleming Brodhead was born in South New Market, New Hampshire, on September 22, 1822. He graduated from Harvard with a degree in law. He then moved to Pontiac, Michigan. He soon was appointed prosecuting attorney and then deputy Secretary of State.
           
At age 27, he became a state senator for Michigan. Brodhead enlisted in April 1847 as 1st Lieutenant and Adjutant in the 15th U.S. Infantry during the Mexican War, and he was brevetted to the rank of captain on August 20, 1847. He was made a full captain on December 2, 1847, and was mustered out on July 31, 1848, when the troops were disbanded. In 1852 he was appointed postmaster of Detroit.

At the beginning of the civil war he raised the 1st Michigan cavalry regiment, at the head of which he served under Generals Banks, Fremont, and Pope. He died of wounds received at the Second Battle of Bull Run on August 31, 1862.

Personal life
Brodhead married Archange Macomb, a daughter of general Macomb and they had six children.

References

1822 births
1862 deaths
People from Newfields, New Hampshire
Harvard Law School alumni
Michigan postmasters
Michigan state senators
American military personnel of the Mexican–American War
Union Army colonels
Union military personnel killed in the American Civil War
19th-century American politicians